Kyamar Noon is a 2018 Burmese drama television series. It aired on MRTV, from March 15, to June 6, 2018, on every Wednesday, Thursday and Friday at 19:15 for 30 episodes.

Cast
Min Oo as U Kyaw Swar
Yan Kyaw as Dr. U Saw Pyae
Su Hlaing Hnin as Daw Mya Hnin Phyu
May Thinzar Oo as Dr. Daw Yadanar
Pho Thauk Kyar as Pyae Phyo Wai
Aung Khant Zaw as Ko Oo
Mya Hnin Yee Lwin as Yu War
Soe Nandar Kyaw as Pan Pwint Wai
Aung Khine as U Thaung
Khin Moht Moht Aye as Sayama Gyi Naw
Zaw Zaw as Ko Chin
Aung Moe as U San Hla Htun

References

Burmese television series
MRTV (TV network) original programming